The 1978 All England Championships was a badminton tournament held at Wembley Arena, London, England, from 15–18 March 1978. The event was sponsored by John Player.

Final results

Men's singles

Seeds
1-2  Rudy Hartono
1-2  Svend Pri
3-4  Flemming Delfs
3-4  Thomas Kihlström
5-8  Morten Frost Hansen
5-8  Liem Swie King

Section 1

Section 2

Women's singles

Seeds
1-2  Gillian Gilks
1-2  Lene Køppen

Section 1

Section 2

References

All England Open Badminton Championships
All England
All England Open Badminton Championships in London
All England Badminton Championships
All England Badminton Championships
All England Badminton Championships